The Andorra women's national football team represents Andorra in women's association football and is controlled by the Andorran Football Federation, the governing body for football in Andorra.

History

Background and development
With a FIFA trigramme of AND and having become FIFA-affiliated in 1996, the national association did not respond to a survey about the status of women's football in the country. In May of the following year, the official who answered another survey from FIFA reckoned that there were 37 active female players, all described as "100% beginners/amateurs". It was further suggested women's football had begun that year in Andorra and that there had been no previous interest in any women's sport. There was no participation in national or international competitions, though three women were employed in the association.

As of 2009, the programme was geared for young girls with player registration starting at the age of six.  There were only six women's teams in the country, all for girls under the age of sixteen and includes a national and schools competition. There is also a national women's competition that took place in 2010–11. 16% of the money from the FIFA Financial Assistance Programme (FAP) is targeted at the technical development of the game, which includes women's football, sport medicine and futsal. This compares to 48% for youth football and 25% for infrastructure.

Between 1991 and 2010, there was no FIFA FUTURO III regional course for women's coaching, no women's football seminar held in the country and no FIFA MA course held for women/youth football.

As part of the development of the national team, the Andorran Football Federation has a club in the Spanish women's league system with the name of ENFAF, competing in the Catalan Primera Divisió Femení Group 2 as of 2022-23, the sixth tier. Their B team competes in the Catalan Segoba Divisió Femení Group 2, the tier below.

The team
On 1 July 2014, the senior team played its first international game in the UEFA Development Tournament celebrated in Gibraltar. Andorra defeated Gibraltar by 1–0, scored by Alba at the 61st minute. The next day, they played its second international game, losing against Luxembourg by 4–0.

On 18 December 2014, UEFA announced Andorra would take part in the UEFA Women's Euro 2017 qualifying. This was their debut competitive match at female football. In its first official game, the team lost 3–5 to Malta. Andorra finished the preliminary round with two more defeats against Faroe Islands by 0–8 and Georgia by 0–7.

On 30 June 2016, the Andorran Football Federation announced José Antonio Martín as the new head coach of the women's national team.

On 18 September 2021, Andorra achieved its second win ever after defeating Liechtenstein in a friendly match by 4–2. Teresa Morató scored a hat-trick, while the fourth goal was netted by Erica Gonçalves.

Team image

Kits and crest

Kit suppliers

Results and fixtures

The following is a list of match results in the last 12 months, as well as any future matches that have been scheduled.

Legend

2022

Head-to-head record

Season to season (ENFAF)
This is a list of the performances of ENFAF, the Andorran Football Federation's team in the Spanish women's league system.

Coaching staff

Current coaching staff

Manager history
 Joan Carles Ruiz (2014–2016)
 José Antonio Martín (2016–)

Players

Current squad
The following are some of the players who were called up for a friendly away match against Gibraltar on 16 February 2022.

Caps and goals accurate up to and including 18 April 2021.

Recent call-ups
The following players have been called up to a squad in the past 12 months.

Records
Friendly games are not included in records

Most capped players

Top goalscorers

Competitive record

FIFA Women's World Cup

*Draws include knockout matches decided on penalty kicks.

UEFA Women's Championship

*Draws include knockout matches decided on penalty kicks.

See also

Andorra women's national under-17 football team

References

External links
Official website
UEFA
FIFA

 
European women's national association football teams